The Schoenstatt Shrine is a Catholic shrine and part of the Apostolic movement founded by Josef Kentenich in Germany in 1914, a place where the Virgin Mary is invited for protection and influence.

History
Father Josef Kentenich was the spiritual director at a junior seminary of the Pallottine fathers preparing missionaries for Africa. In April 1914 a Marian sodality was formed at the seminary, and the superior offered the sodality the Chapel of St. Michael, near the school. Father Kentenich was inspired by the work of Bartolo Longo in creating the Shrine  to Our Lady of the Rosary off Pompei, and wished to create a shrine to Mary at Schoenstatt. 

A central point in the movement's dynamics and faith is the devotion to the Shrine, based on the first shrine in Schoenstatt where the movement started with a special devotion to Mary and of which there are dozens of replicas around the world.

Notes

Shrines to the Virgin Mary
Marian devotions
Roman Catholic shrines in Germany